Ilwaco is a city in Pacific County, Washington, United States. The population was 936 at the 2010 census. Founded in 1890, the city was home to the Ilwaco Railway and Navigation Company along the Long Beach Peninsula, with its core economy based on logging and timber rafting. The city is located on the southern edge of the Long Beach Peninsula, on Baker Bay on the north side of the Columbia River where it meets the Pacific Ocean. It is near the city of Astoria, Oregon, which lies to the southeast on the southern bank of the Columbia.

History

Ilwaco was first settled by Henry Feister in 1851, and was named for the Lower Chinook leader Elwahko Jim, whose indigenous name was [ʔɪlwəkʷo], the son in law of Chief Comcomly. Ilwaco was officially incorporated on December 16, 1890. A narrow gauge railway, Ilwaco Railway and Navigation Company, ran for over thirty years. Similarly to the nearby city of Astoria, Oregon, and the surrounding communities, Ilwaco historically had a significant population of Finnish immigrants.

The depot was built nearby on Spruce Street. A siding was built for the Ilwaco Mill and Lumber Company. A published photo shows the passenger depot on the west side of First Street, at a point 14.8 miles (23.8 km) from the Ilwaco Depot to Nahcotta. The Ilwaco freight depot was in a different building. The freight depot survived to modern times, and has been relocated to become part of the Columbia Pacific Heritage Museum.

The train ran out on the dock in Ilwaco.  Floating logs were stored behind log booms on the west side of the Ilwaco dock. At some point after 1890, First Street had been covered with wooden planks, and remained so until 1916, when it was paved over. By 1915, a published photo shows many more businesses along First Street.

In addition to the city's logging industry, it has had a history as a cranberry producer, with cranberry bogs located immediately north of its downtown.

Geography

Ilwaco is located at  (46.312541, -124.029688) on the Long Beach Peninsula.

Climate
This region experiences warm (but not hot) and dry summers, with no average monthly temperatures above 71.6 °F.  According to the Köppen Climate Classification system, Ilwaco has a warm-summer Mediterranean climate, abbreviated "Csb" on climate maps.

Demographics

2010 census
As of the census of 2010, there were 936 people, 443 households, and 257 families living in the city. The racial makeup of the city was 89.9% White, 0.3% African American, 2.1% Native American, 0.5% Asian, 3.6% from other races, and 3.5% from two or more races. Hispanic or Latino of any race were 5.7% of the population.

There were 443 households, of which 21.2% had children under the age of 18 living with them, 46.7% were married couples living together, 8.4% had a female householder with no husband present, 2.9% had a male householder with no wife present, and 42.0% were non-families. 35.7% of all households were made up of individuals, and 13.7% had someone living alone who was 65 years of age or older. The average household size was 2.11 and the average family size was 2.68.

The median age in the city was 50.2 years. 16.7% of residents were under the age of 18; 5.2% were between the ages of 18 and 24; 21.2% were from 25 to 44; 35.3% were from 45 to 64; and 21.6% were 65 years of age or older. The gender makeup of the city was 51.5% male and 48.5% female.

2000 census
As of the census of 2000, there were 950 people, 416 households, and 260 families living in the city. The population density was 461.5 people per square mile (178.1/km2). There were 524 housing units at an average density of 254.6 per square mile (98.2/km2). The racial makeup of the city was 92.84% White, 0.53% African American, 1.37% Native American, 0.42% Asian, 0.11% Pacific Islander, 1.79% from other races, and 2.95% from two or more races. Hispanic or Latino of any race were 5.26% of the population. 15.9% were of German, 13.6% Finnish, 10.1% English, 5.8% American, 5.2% Swedish and 5.1% Norwegian ancestry according to Census 2000.

There were 416 households, out of which 27.2% had children under the age of 18 living with them, 52.4% were married couples living together, 8.7% had a female householder with no husband present, and 37.5% were non-families. 33.4% of all households were made up of individuals, and 16.6% had someone living alone who was 65 years of age or older. The average household size was 2.28 and the average family size was 2.92.

In the city, the population was spread out, with 24.2% under the age of 18, 4.9% from 18 to 24, 23.6% from 25 to 44, 27.3% from 45 to 64, and 20.0% who were 65 years of age or older. The median age was 43 years. For every 100 females, there were 90.4 males. For every 100 females age 18 and over, there were 83.2 males.

The median income for a household in the city was $29,632, and the median income for a family was $34,934. Males had a median income of $29,821 versus $21,442 for females. The per capita income for the city was $16,138. About 10.3% of families and 16.3% of the population were below the poverty line, including 21.1% of those under age 18 and 16.3% of those age 65 or over.

References

Works cited

External links

 History of Ilwaco at HistoryLink
 Ilwaco Washington: By Land or Sea
 Ilwaco in 1897
 B.A. Seaborg Cannery, Ilwaco, 1897
 Modern view of First Street in Ilwaco, looking north.  The railroad would have run past some of the older buildings in this photograph
 Modern view of fishing fleet at Ilwaco

Cities in Washington (state)
Cities in Pacific County, Washington
Washington (state) populated places on the Columbia River
Populated coastal places in Washington (state)
1851 establishments in Oregon Territory
Washington placenames of Native American origin